We Pierce is a 2003 novel by Andrew Huebner.  It tells the story of two brothers, Smith and Sam.  Smith leads a tank company into battle in Iraq during the Gulf War, while Sam protests the war and struggles with alcohol and narcotic abuse.

References

2003 novels
Novels set during the Gulf War